Golden Pot is a hamlet in the East Hampshire district of Hampshire, England. It lies 2.4 miles (3.9 km) north of Alton, on the B3349 road.

The nearest railway station is 2.4 miles (3.9 km) south of the village, at Alton.

External links

Villages in Hampshire